José Luis Montes Vicente (10 August 1956 – 18 August 2013) was a Spanish professional football player and manager.

Career
Born in Segovia, Montes played as a goalkeeper for Real Madrid Castilla, Getafe Deportivo, Real Valladolid, Deportivo de La Coruña, Hércules CF, CF Lorca Deportiva and UD Melilla.

He later became a football manager, and was in charge of Écija, Algeciras, Melilla, Sabadell, Cartagena, Marbella, Cacereño, Conquense and Villanovense.

Death
He died on 18 August 2013.

References

1956 births
2013 deaths
Spanish footballers
Association football goalkeepers
La Liga players
Segunda División players
Segunda División B players
Real Madrid Castilla footballers
Getafe Deportivo players
Real Valladolid players
Deportivo de La Coruña players
Hércules CF players
UD Melilla footballers
Spanish football managers
Segunda División managers
Écija Balompié managers
Algeciras CF managers
UD Melilla managers
CE Sabadell FC managers
FC Cartagena managers
Marbella FC managers
CP Cacereño managers
UB Conquense managers
CF Villanovense managers